Craig L. Fuller (born February 16, 1951) is an American political strategist who served as White House Cabinet Secretary under President Ronald Reagan from 1981 to 1985 and as Chief of Staff to the Vice President of the United States under George H. W. Bush from 1985 to 1989.

Fuller was co-director of the presidential transition of George H. W. Bush.

References

External links

1951 births
California Republicans
Chiefs of Staff to the Vice President of the United States
Living people